Michael Lee Firkins (born May 19, 1967) is an American electric guitar player, whose sound fuses bluegrass, country, blues, and jazz elements, into his distorted rock sound. He is noted amongst guitarists for his prolific use of hybrid picking at high speeds.

Early life
Firkins was born in 1967, in Omaha, Nebraska, to musician parents; his father was a lap steel guitarist and his mother a pianist.  He started playing acoustic guitar at age eight. Though mostly self-taught, he also took lessons at a local Omaha music store. Learning the songs of the times, Firkins was influenced by the guitar stylings of Lynyrd Skynyrd, Led Zeppelin, AC/DC, and Black Sabbath.

Career
By 1979, Firkins had a Gibson SG and a Fender Princeton Reverb. Now wielding an electrified tone, he played in local bands and in church from the age of 12 until 18. In 1985, Firkins started touring the country in cover bands. He eventually went back to Omaha and began teaching guitar.

Firkins recorded a five-song demo [recorded at rainbow recording Studios Omaha] of instrumental guitar tunes. The demo was sent to Shrapnel Records, resulting in a record contract and subsequent release of his first album.

In 1990, Firkins released his self-titled debut album. This release showcased Firkins's encyclopedic knowledge of bluegrass and country licks. With the strength of this album and the help of an international advertising campaign from Yamaha guitars to promote the company's Pacifica models, Firkins's first release sold more than 100,000 copies. This well-received album also landed him the top spot in the category of “Best New Talent” in a readers' poll in Guitar Player magazine that year. He was also hailed as “One of the Most Influential Players of the Next Ten Years” by Guitar for the Practicing Musician. Firkins's music was also popular in Europe, as Firkins won the Edison Award, which is the equivalent of a Grammy in the Netherlands.

Firkins went on to release three more records for the Shrapnel label. His sound would go on to incorporate even more diverse music styles, specifically jazz, as shown in a cover of Duke Ellington's “The Mooche” on Firkins' third album, Chapter Eleven. Cactus Cruz was his last recording for Shrapnel in 1996.

In 1997, Firkins recorded Decomposition for Nuerra Records. An album composed of covers, Firkins pays tribute to some of his earlier influences, such as Lynyrd Skynyrd, Johnny Winter, and Jimi Hendrix.

In the early 2000s, he teamed up with fellow guitarist Gabriel Moses for a side project titled "Dose Amigos" which has been most frequently compared to the likes of Tenacious D.  Both guitarists incorporated elements of bluegrass and heavy metal at extremely high speeds, with humorous themes.  The project showcased Firkins and Gabriel's original technique of emulating a slide guitar with the use of the tremolo arm.

Discography

Albums
1990: Michael Lee Firkins
1994: Howling Iguanas
1995: Chapter Eleven
1996: Cactus Crüz
1999: Decomposition
2007: Black Light Sonatas
2013: Yep

Instructional
2009: Mastering Lead Guitar, Michael Lee Firkins, Hot Licks Productions, Inc.

Guest musician
1992: Blues Tracks, Pat Travers, RoadRunner
1994: Cream of the Crop, A Tribute, RoadRunner
1996: Perspective, Jason Becker
1997: Best of the Blues Plus Live, Pat Travers, Blues Bureau Int'l
1997: Guitar Battle, Victor Records
1997: The Jimi Hendrix Music Festival, Provogue
2001: Staring at the Sun, Neil Zaza, Melodik Records
2004: Take You Higher, Clinton Administration, Magna Carta
2008: Collection:, Jason Becker, Shrapnel
2009: This is Shredding, Vol. 1, Shrapnel
2013: The Manhattan Blues Project'', Steve Hunter, Deacon Records
2018: Triumphant Hearts, Jason Becker, Music Theories / Mascot Label Records

References

External links

Living people
1967 births
American rock guitarists
Shrapnel Records artists